Ledina is a dispersed settlement in the hills northwest of Sevnica in east-central Slovenia. The area is part of the historical region of Styria. The entire Municipality of Sevnica is now included in the Lower Sava Statistical Region.

Mass grave
Ledina is the site of a mass grave from the end of the Second World War. The Ledina Mass Grave is located along the road south of the settlement. It contains the remains of five German soldiers that were shot at the end of the war.

References

External links
Ledina at Geopedia

Populated places in the Municipality of Sevnica